Lyman Fessenden Walker (1836–1920) was an American shipwright during a prolific period at Yarmouth Harbor in Maine. His shipyard was one of the four major ones during the town's peak years of 1850–1875. His shipyard launched forty vessels of all sizes.

Early life
Walker was born in 1836, to Lyman Walker and Louisa Merchant.

Career
After beginning as a shipwright, in 1841 he was recognized as a master builder.

Death
Walker died in 1920, aged 83 or 84.

References

1836 births
1920 deaths
People from North Yarmouth, Maine
People from Yarmouth, Maine
American shipwrights